Carson Gerald Long (born December 16, 1954) is a former American football placekicker in the National Football League (NFL) who played for the Buffalo Bills. He played college football at University of Pittsburgh.

He played 9 games in 1977 and made 7 out of his 11 field goal attempts.

References 

1954 births
Living people
Sportspeople from Pottsville, Pennsylvania
Players of American football from Pennsylvania
American football placekickers
Pittsburgh Panthers football players
Buffalo Bills players